Scali Bread is an Italian-American style of bread made predominantly in the Boston, Massachusetts area. It is a braided loaf that is covered in sesame seeds. It was originally made by the Scali family of Boston, and is now a regional specialty.

Available at many bakeries in the Boston area, a Scali can be purchased intact or quickly sliced on an industrial bread slicer. One bakery that has been making the traditional form for decades is the Winter Hill Bakery, a popular Somerville source of this loaf for decades.

See also
 List of American breads
 Italian Americans in Boston

References

American breads
Culture of Boston
Italian-American cuisine
Italian-American culture in Boston
Massachusetts cuisine
Braided egg breads